Kris Knoblauch (born September 24, 1978) is a Canadian professional ice hockey coach, former player and the current head coach of the Hartford Wolf Pack of the American Hockey League (AHL). He had a total of 13 seasons of coaching experience before joining Hartford, including two seasons as an assistant coach with the Philadelphia Flyers of the National Hockey League (NHL), and seven years as a head coach in the Canadian junior leagues, during which time he compiled a record of 298–130–16–13.

Career
Knoblauch is from Imperial, Saskatchewan. He was a seventh-round pick, and the 166th pick overall, of the New York Islanders in the 1997 NHL Entry Draft, but never played at the NHL level. Playing in the position of winger, Knoblauch played parts of four seasons of junior hockey in the Western Hockey League (WHL) from 1995 to 1998 with the Red Deer Rebels, Kootenay Ice, and Lethbridge Hurricanes. He then played for five seasons with the Alberta Golden Bears from 1999 to 2003, during which time he registered 117 points (38 goals and 79 assists) in 102 games. He was part of the team that won a National Championship during the 1999–00 season. Knoblauch would play professionally with the Austin Ice Bats of the Central Hockey League, before finishing his playing career in France as a member of the Bisons de Neuilly-sur-Marne.

Coaching career
Knoblauch began his coaching career as an assistant coach with the Prince Albert Raiders of the WHL during the 2006–07 season. He became an assistant coach with the Kootenay Ice of the WHL for three seasons from 2007 to 2010, becoming the Ice's head coach in 2010.

Kootenay Ice
In his first season with Kootenay during the 2010–11 season, the team posted a 46–21–1–4 record in the regular season, won 16 of 19 WHL playoff games, and won the Ed Chynoweth Cup. Knoblauch continued his success with the Ice the following season, as the team posted a 36-26-5 record, but was swept by the Edmonton Oil Kings in the first round of the WHL playoffs. 

Knoblauch interviewed for the vacant head coaching position with the University of Alberta Golden Bears men's ice hockey team, and did so without consulting the Ice. Despite  being on the shortlist for the Golden Bears coaching job, Knoblauch was relieved of his head coaching duties with the Ice on 24 May, 2012.

Erie Otters
Knoblauch became the Erie Otters head coach of the Ontario Hockey League (OHL), a position he held from 2012 to 2017.

During his four full seasons with the Erie Otters, the team had a 204–58–7–3 record (.768 points percentage) and won at least 50 games each season. They were the first team in Canadian Hockey League history to post four consecutive 50-win seasons. Erie won the OHL Championship in the 2016–17 season under Knoblauch's leadership. Additionally, the Otters made it to the OHL Championship in the 2014–15 season, and won the Hamilton Spectator Trophy in recognition of having the OHL's best regular season record in consecutive seasons from 2015–16 and 2016–17. Knoblauch was the recipient of the Matt Leyden Trophy in 2015–16, making him OHL Coach of the Year that season. He also made OHL's Second All-Star Team in 2013–14.

Knoblauch was the head coach for Canada-Red at the 2015 World U17 Hockey Challenge, and assistant coach with Canada at the 2017 IIHF World U20 Championship, where Canada earned a Silver Medal. During his seven total seasons as head coach of the Kootenay Ice and Erie Otters, Knoblauch compiled a record of 298–130–16–13, and coached such players as Connor McDavid, Alex DeBrincat, André Burakovsky, Connor Brown, Erik Černák, Anthony Cirelli, and Travis Dermott, Sam Reinhart, and Dylan Strome.

Philadelphia Flyers
Knoblauch was a Philadelphia Flyers assistant coach during the team's 2017–18 and 2018–19 seasons.

Hartford Wolf Pack
The New York Rangers organization announced on July 29, 2019, that Knoblauch had been appointed the head coach of the Hartford Wolf Pack, the Rangers' AHL affiliate team. This marks the first time Knoblauch became a head coach at the professional level. Knoblauch replaced Keith McCambridge, who was fired after two seasons as Hartford coach. Knoblauch is the seventh coach in Wolf Pack history. On March 17, 2021, Knoblauch served as the New York Rangers' head coach when David Quinn and his staff were placed on the COVID-19 protocol list, in his first game the Rangers beat the Philadelphia Flyers 9-0 at MSG. Quinn would be out for six games total, the Rangers won four games and lost two under Knoblauch.

Career statistics

Playing career

Coaching record

References

External links
 

Alberta Golden Bears ice hockey players
Erie Otters coaches
Hartford Wolf Pack
Kootenay Ice coaches
Kootenay Ice players
Lethbridge Hurricanes players
Living people
New York Islanders draft picks
Ice hockey people from Saskatchewan
Philadelphia Flyers coaches
Prince Albert Raiders coaches
Red Deer Rebels players
1978 births
Canadian ice hockey forwards
Canadian ice hockey coaches